Patrick "Pa" Bourke (born 18 May 1988 in Thurles, County Tipperary) is an Irish sportsperson.  He plays hurling with his local club Thurles Sarsfields and with the Tipperary senior inter-county team.

Early life

Pa Bourke was born in Thurles, County Tipperary in 1988.  He was born into a family steeped in hurling history as his grandfather, John Maher, captained Tipperary to the All-Ireland title in 1945, having already won senior All-Ireland medals as far back as 1930 and 1937.  Bourke was educated locally at the Christian Brothers secondary school in the town, where his hurling skills were first developed.  He was a key member of the team in 2005 when his school were defeated by St. Flannans of Ennis in the final of the Dr. Harty Cup.

Playing career

Club

Bourke plays his club hurling with the famous Thurles Sarsfields club in his home town and has enjoyed some success.  He first came to prominence as a dual player at minor level.  Bourke had little success on the minor hurling field; however, he won back-to-back minor football titles in 2005 and 2006.  His performance in the latter final earned him the Man of the Match title.  Bourke has since moved onto the club's under-21 and senior teams. Pa won his second county championship medal in 2009 with a starring role for the team in their victory over neighbours Drom & Inch. In 2010 Sarsfields defeated Toomevara in the county semi final with Bourke scoring a crucial last minute goal to sicken the former champions. Bourke suffered a minor injury to the calf three weeks later whilst on vacation in Corfu.

Inter-county

Bourke first came to prominence on the inter-county scene as a member of the Tipperary minor hurling team in 2005, however, he had little success in his first year.  Cork defeated Tipp in the Munster final in 2006, however, Tipp still qualified for the All-Ireland final.  On that occasion Tipp defeated Galway giving Bourke an All-Ireland Minor Hurling Championship medal.  Bourke also finished the championship as the top scorers after recording a respectable 3 goals and 35 points in only a handful of games.  He made his senior debut in 2007, however, it was an unhappy year for Tipperary's senior hurling team.  Bourke returned to the substitute's bench for Tipp's National Hurling League triumph in 2008. Pa is still enjoying success at club level and recently scored 6.3 earning him man of the match against Loughmore in the Mid Tipperary Senior hurling final.

On 5 September 2010, Bourke was a non-playing substitute as Tipperary won their 26th All Ireland title, beating reigning champions Killkenny by 4-17 to 1-18 in the final, preventing Kilkenny from achieving an historic 5-in-a-row, it was Bourke's first All-Ireland winners medal.

Career statistics

Club

References

External links
 Tipperary Player Profiles

Teams

1988 births
Living people
Thurles Sarsfields hurlers
Tipperary inter-county hurlers